One-Punch Man is a Japanese manga series written by One and illustrated by Yusuke Murata. One began publishing One-Punch Man as a webcomic in 2009. In April 2019, the webcomic resumed publication after a two-year hiatus. , the manga remake has released 176 chapters. When the series became popular, receiving 7.9 million hits by June 2012, Yusuke Murata contacted One and proposed to redraw the comic for digital publication in Weekly Young Jump's spin-off manga website , published by Shueisha.  The first chapter was published on June 14, 2012.

The series began publication in Viz Media's Weekly Shonen Jump (Shonen Jump Alpha at the time) in North America on January 21, 2013.  The first digital volume in February 2014.  One-Punch Man was one of a number of series that Viz made available on ComiXology in June 2014.  The manga was released in print in the United States starting in September 2015.

, the manga series has been collected into 27 tankōbon volumes, 24 of which have been republished in English.

Volume list
Individual chapters of the series are called punches; for example, chapter 37 is "Punch 37". Bonus manga that are one to two page(s) long are not listed in the index. Bonus chapters are listed after chapter lists.

Chapters not yet in tankōbon format
These chapters have yet to be published in a tankōbon volume.

References

External links
  
  

One-Punch Man
Chapters